"Twin Sisters" may refer to:

Female twins

Arts and entertainment
Twin Sisters (1934 film), a Chinese film 
Twin Sisters (2002 film), or De tweeling, a Dutch film 
Twin Sisters (2013 film), a Norwegian documentary 
Twin Sisters of Kyoto, a 1963 Japanese drama film 
Mr Twin Sister, an American band

Places in the United States
Twin Sisters, Texas
Twin Sisters (California), twin summits of a mountain 
Twin Sisters (Colorado), a mountain summit
Twin Sisters Peaks, mountains in Colorado
Twin Sisters Mountain, in Washington
Twin Sisters Basalt, a pillar near Wallula Gap, Washington

Other uses 
 Twin Sisters (cannons), from the Texas Revolution

See also

Twin (disambiguation)
Twins (disambiguation)